San Sostene is a village and comune in the province of Catanzaro in the Calabria region of southern Italy. It is one of the smallest comuni in the province. 
 
The town is bordered by Badolato, Brognaturo, Cardinale, Davoli, Isca sullo Ionio, Sant'Andrea Apostolo dello Ionio and Satriano.

Economy
The main economical activities in the comune include:
 use of wind power
 cultivation of chestnuts
 production of olive oil
 production of wine for themselves

References

Cities and towns in Calabria